The Rosemarkie Stone or Rosemarkie Cross,  a Class II Pictish stone, is one of the major surviving examples of Pictish art in stone.

Discovery
Carved from fine-grained sandstone, the Rosemarkie stone was found sometime prior to 1821 in the floor of the old church in the village of Rosemarkie.  Rosemarkie was the probable site of a major Pictish monastery, on the Black Isle of Easter Ross.  When found, the stone was broken into two parts that have since been reconstructed.   The reconstructed stone is now on display in Rosemarkie's Groam House Museum.

Description
On the front side is an elaborately decorated cross, while on the reverse side are various common Pictish symbols, including three crescents and v-rods and a double-disc and Z-rod, as well as a smaller cross at the bottom. It is the only Pictish stone to bear three versions of the same symbol.  The sides are also decorated with a number of interlace patterns.

See also
Rosemarkie sculpture fragments

References

Further reading
 Fraser, Iain, Ritchie, J.N.G., et al., Pictish Symbol Stones: An Illustrated Gazetteer, (Royal Commission on the Ancient and Historical Monuments of Scotland, 1999)
 Jones, Duncan, A Wee Guide to The Picts, (Musselburgh, 2003)
 MacNamara, Ellen, The Pictish Stones of Easter Ross, (Tain, 2003)

External links
 Am Baile

Pictish stones
Pictish stones in Highland (council area)
Black Isle

fr:Pierres Pictes de Ross